Hodgesia malayi is a species of zoophilic mosquito belonging to the genus Hodgesia. It is found in Sri Lanka, India, Malaya, Indochina, Philippines, Moluccas, Thailand, and Maluku.

References

External links
Hodgesia Theobald, 1904 - Mosquito Taxonomic Inventory

malayi